Anucha Chuaysri is a former professional football player from Thailand.

External links
Profile at Thaipremierleague.co.th

Living people
Anucha Chuaysri
1979 births
Anucha Chuaysri
Association football forwards
Anucha Chuaysri
Home United FC players
Anucha Chuaysri
Anucha Chuaysri
Anucha Chuaysri
Anucha Chuaysri